Næsby Stadium (Danish: Næsby Stadion) is an association football stadium located in Kirkendrup in the northern part of Odense, Denmark. It has been the home ground of 2nd Division club Næsby Boldklub since its construction in 1984. Besides the stadium, which has a capacity of 2,500, the ground also includes an artificial pitch, a playground, a street football pitch, outdoor fitness as well as the cafeteria Den Blå Café. In May 2016 it was renamed ALPI Arena Næsby, after the naming rights were acquired by logistics company, ALPI.

References

 

Football venues in Denmark
Buildings and structures in Odense Municipality